William Bannerman may refer to:
 William Bannerman (politician) (1841–1914), Scottish-born Canadian politician
 William Bannerman (minister) (1822–1902), Presbyterian minister in Otago, New Zealand
 William Burney Bannerman (1858–1924), Scottish military surgeon